Jiyo Kaka is a 2011 Indian Bengali 
comedy film directed by debutant Parambrata Chattopadhyay, the renowned film actor.

Cast 
 Abhiraj
 Rahul
 Saswata Chattopadhyay
 Koushik Ganguly
 Rituparna Sengupta
 Rudranil Ghosh
 Rana Basu Thakur
 Anindya Ghosh

Soundtrack 
The Jiyo Kaka soundtrack's music director is Neel Dutt, Rupam Islam, Chandrabindoo (band) and the lyrics penned by  Srijato.

References 

2011 films
2011 comedy-drama films
Bengali-language Indian films
2010s Bengali-language films
Films set in Kolkata
Indian comedy films